This is an alphabetical list of villages in Viluppuram district, Tamil Nadu, India.

A 

 Andikuli
 Anichangkuppam
 Annamputhur
 Anniyur
 Anumandai
 Aruvapakkam
 Avalurpet

B-J 

 Brahmadesam, Tindivanam taluk
 Brahmadesam, Viluppuram taluk
 Chendur
 Endiyur
 Irumbai

K 

 Kanchiyur
 Kappur
 Katranpakkam
 Kil Sevalambady
 Kilvalai
 Koonimedu
 Kooteripattu
 Kottakarai
 Kozhipattu
 Kuilappalayam

M-O 

 Mailam
 Mambalapattu
 Meenambur
 Melpathy
 Mugaiyur
 Mundiyampakkam
 Murukkery
 Nangathur
 Nangilikondan
 Neganur
 Nehanurpatti
 Omandur
 olundiyapet

P-T 

 Panchalam
 Parrikal
 Pennagar, Gingee
 Perani
 Perumpoondi
 Perumukkal
 Pettai, Villupuram
 Pombur
 Sathiyamangalam, Viluppuram
 Settavarai
 Thiruvakkarai

V 

 Vadambalam
 Valathi
 Veedur
 Veeracholapuram
 Viranamur

Viluppuram district